Saša Milaimović (born August 27, 1975) is a Croatian retired footballer who played professionally most notably in Asia, and North America.

Playing career
Milaimović began his career in his native country Croatia in 1993 with NK Osijek in the 1. HNL. In 2000, he went abroad to South Korea to play with Pohang Steelers of the K-League. He played with Győri ETO FC in the Nemzeti Bajnokság I from 2002-2003. Milaimović went to North America in 2004 to sign with the Hamilton Thunder in the Canadian Professional Soccer League. Where he finished as the team's third highest goalscorer with 8 goals, and won the Western Conference title. He featured in the club's postseason semi-final match against the Toronto Croatia, but lost the match to a score of 2-0.

Managerial career
His first managerial spells were at Zagreb's lower league sides Maksimir and Devetka and he was appointed coach at the Saudi Arabian national football academy in April 2022.

References 

1975 births
Living people
People from Derventa
Association football forwards
Croatian footballers
NK Osijek players
Pohang Steelers players
Győri ETO FC players
Hamilton Thunder players
Croatian Football League players
K League 1 players
Nemzeti Bajnokság I players
Canadian Soccer League (1998–present) players
Croatian expatriate footballers
Expatriate footballers in South Korea
Croatian expatriate sportspeople in South Korea
Expatriate footballers in Hungary
Croatian expatriate sportspeople in Hungary
Expatriate soccer players in Canada
Croatian expatriate sportspeople in Canada
Croatian football managers
Croatian expatriate sportspeople in Saudi Arabia